Matrona of Barcelona or Matrona of Thessalonica is a saint of the Roman Catholic Church and the Orthodox Church. She was recognized as a saint pre-congregation.

She lived in the third or fourth century. She was a young girl and a slave to the Jewish woman Pautila (or Pantilla), wife of one of the military commanders (some sources say governor) of Thessalonica. According to legend, she believed in Christ from her youth and Pautila constantly tried to convert her to Judaism. There are two stories of her martyrdom in one she was killed in Rome for taking time to ministering to Christians, in the other she was so severely beaten when she refused to enter a synagogue with her mistress that she subsequently died of her wounds.

She is venerated in Barcelona and some villages in Catalonia. She is patron saint of the Santa Madrona church in Barcelona, the Santa Madrona hermitage in the mountain of Montjuïc, as well as churches in the villages of Madrona (Pinell de Solsonès) and Móra d'Ebre. The feast day for the Matrona of Barcelona is 15 March, while that of the Matrona of Thessalonica is 27 March (9 April old style).

Notes

External links
 Vatican.va
 CatholicSaints

3rd-century Roman women
4th-century Roman women
Christian child saints
Saints of Roman Thessalonica
Saints from Hispania
Christian slaves and freedmen
Deaths by beating in Europe